John K. Hagerty (November 8, 1867 – November 18, 1945) was an American politician from Pennsylvania who served as a Republican member of the Pennsylvania House of Representatives for Delaware County from 1921 to 1922.

Early life
Hagerty was born in Upland, Pennsylvania. He worked as a machinist at the John Wetherill Manufacturing Company and as chief engineer and master mechanic at the Eddystone Manufacturing Company.

Career
Hagerty was elected to the Chester City Council and served from 1907 to 1918.  He was the superintendent of Public Safety for Chester from 1914 to 1918 and school tax collector from 1918 to 1920.

Hagerty was elected to the Pennsylvania House of Representatives for Delaware County and served from 1921 to 1922.  He was not a candidate for reelection for the 1923 House term.

He served as postmaster for the United States Postal Service for the Chester post office from 1923 to 1935.

He died in Chester, Pennsylvania, and is interred at the Chester Rural Cemetery.

References

1867 births
1945 deaths
20th-century American politicians
Burials at Chester Rural Cemetery
Republican Party members of the Pennsylvania House of Representatives
Pennsylvania city council members
Pennsylvania postmasters
People from Chester, Pennsylvania